Queen River or Queen of the River or River Queen or variant, may refer to:

Queen River
 Queen River, Tasmania; a tributary of the King River in Australia
 Queen River (Rhode Island); a river in the United States of America
 Quinn River (Nevada, USA); a river formerly known as "Queen River"

River Queen
 Paddle steamer nickname
 ; a U.S. steamboat
 River Queen (2005 film) a New Zealand war film
 Riverqueen; a French thoroughbred racehorse

See also
 Queen (disambiguation)
 River (disambiguation)